Martin is a ghost town in Saline Township, Ellis County, Kansas, United States.

History
Martin was issued a post office in 1875. The post office was discontinued in 1894.

References

Further reading

External links
 Ellis County maps: Current, Historic, KDOT

Former populated places in Ellis County, Kansas
Former populated places in Kansas